The Lady and the Unicorn is the modern title given to a series of six tapestries created in the style of  ("thousand flowers") and woven in Flanders from wool and silk, from designs ("cartoons") drawn in Paris around 1500. The set is on display in the Musée de Cluny in Paris.

Five of the tapestries are commonly interpreted as depicting the five senses – taste, hearing, sight, smell, and touch. The sixth displays the words . The tapestry's intended meaning is obscure, but has been interpreted as representing love or understanding. Each of the six tapestries depicts a noble lady with the unicorn on her left and a lion on her right; some include a monkey in the scene.

History 
The tapestries were rediscovered in 1841 by Prosper Mérimée in Boussac castle (owned at the time by the subprefect of the Creuse) where they had been suffering damage from their storage conditions. In 1844, the novelist George Sand saw them and brought public attention to the tapestries in her works at the time (most notably in her novel Jeanne), in which she correctly dated them to the end of the 15th century, using the ladies' costumes for reference. Nevertheless, the tapestries continued to be threatened by damp and mould until 1863, when they were bought by Edmond Du Sommerard, curator of the Musée de Cluny in Paris, where careful conservation has restored them nearly to their former glory and where they are still on display.

Content and themes 

The subject of the tapestries is complex, and scholars "now (generally) agree that they present a meditation on earthly pleasures and courtly culture, offered through an allegory of the senses."

The pennants, as well as the armor of the unicorn and lion in the tapestry appear to bear the arms of Jean IV Le Viste, a powerful nobleman in the court of Charles VII of France and presumably its sponsor. The arms, however, appear to break the rules of French heraldry with an incorrect superposition of colors. A very recent study of the heraldry appears to lend credence to another hypothesis (previously dismissed) that the real sponsor of the tapestry was Antoine II Le Viste (1470–1534), a descendant of the younger branch of the Le Viste family and an important figure at the court of Charles VIII, Louis XII and François I.

Touch

The 'Touch' tapestry displays a noble lady standing with one hand touching the horn of a unicorn, and the other holding up a pennant. A lion sits to the side and looks on.

Taste

In the 'Taste' tapestry, the lady takes sweets from a dish held by a maidservant. Her eyes are on a parakeet on her upheld left hand. The lion and the unicorn are both standing on their hind legs, reaching up to pennants that frame the lady on either side. The monkey is at her feet, eating one of the sweetmeats.

Smell

In the 'Smell' tapestry, the lady stands, making a wreath of flowers. Her maidservant holds a basket of flowers within her easy reach. Again, the lion and unicorn frame the lady while holding on to the pennants. The monkey has stolen a flower which he is smelling, providing the key to the allegory.

Hearing
In the 'Hearing' tapestry, the lady plays a portative organ on top of a table covered with an Oriental rug. Her maidservant stands to the opposite side and operates the bellows. The lion and unicorn once again frame the scene holding up the pennants. Just as on all the other tapestries, the unicorn is to the lady's left and the lion to her right.

Sight
In the 'Sight' tapestry, the lady is seated, holding a mirror up in her right hand. The unicorn kneels on the ground, with his front legs in the lady's lap, from which he gazes at his reflection in the mirror. The lion on the left holds up a pennant.

The sixth tapestry is wider than the others, and has a somewhat different style. The lady stands in front of a tent, across the top of which is inscribed her motto, one of the deliberately obscure and elegant mottos, typically alluding to courtly love, adopted by the nobility during the age of chivalry. It is variously interpreted as "to my only/sole desire", "according to my desire alone"; "by my will alone", "love desires only beauty of soul", and "to calm passion". These frequently appear on artworks and illuminated miniatures. Her maidservant stands to the right, holding open a chest. The lady is placing the necklace she wears in the other tapestries, into the chest. To her left is a low bench with a dog, possibly a Maltese, sitting on a decorative pillow. It is the only tapestry in which she is seen to smile. The unicorn and the lion stand in their normal spots framing the lady while holding onto the pennants.

This tapestry has elicited a number of interpretations. One interpretation sees the lady putting the necklace into the chest as a renunciation of the passions aroused by the other senses, and as an assertion of her free will. Another sees the tapestry as representing a sixth sense of understanding (derived from the sermons of Jean Gerson of the University of Paris). Various other interpretations see the tapestry as representing love or virginity.

In the first five tapestries, one or more of the animals are shown using the represented sense along with the lady. In Touch, the unicorn can presumably feel the lady's hand touching its horn; in Taste, a monkey is eating a sweetmeat; in Smell, the monkey is sniffing a flower; in Hearing, the animals presumably all hear the music; and in Sight, the unicorn is gazing at itself in a mirror. In the final tapestry, only the women engage with the necklace. The blue tent in the last tapestry also serves to separate the human figures from the natural world, including the mythical unicorn, and is not present in any of the previous tapestries.

Gallery

Popular culture

 All six tapestries are used to cover the bare stone walls in the Gryffindor common room as seen in the Harry Potter film series.
 The sixth tapestry, is prominently featured in the Mobile Suit Gundam Unicorn OVA and the Mobile Suit Gundam Unicorn RE:0096 TV anime series.
 The cover art for the UnChild music album from 2014 by Sawano Hiroyuki and Aimer, which features songs from the aforementioned OVA, is based on the tapestry, replacing the lion with a black and gold unicorn, mirroring the white unicorn.
 A fictional account of the creation of the tapestries is described in the novel "The Lady and the Unicorn" (2003) , by Tracy Chevalier.
 The tapestries are featured in the 2017 British drama film The Escape.
 The tapestries are also described in The Notebooks of Malte Laurids Brigge by Rainer Maria Rilke.
 Peter Grudzien's album "The Unicorn" uses snippets of the tapestries for its album artwork
 The works were a free inspiration for Moreau's The Unicorns

 The tapestry appears in the Little Einsteins episode The Song of The Unicorn where the lady in the tapestry casts a spell on the unicorn turning him into stone.

See also
 The Hunt of the Unicorn
 Venus effect

Notes

References

Bibliography
Jean-Patrice Boudet, La Dame à la licorne et ses sources médiévales d'inspiration

External links

 The Unicorn
 Lady and the Unicorn Tapestries Musée du Moyen Age photos and discussions of the six tapestries. (Retrieved from the Internet Archive's copy on 25 February 2014)
 De Vitis, Mark (2006). "Explainer: the symbolism of The Lady and the Unicorn tapestry cycle", The Conversation. 
 Mary Tudor - Brandon, Duchess of Suffolk, the mysterious Lady of The Lady and the Unicorn ? http://dame-licorne.pagesperso-orange.fr/
  Mary Tudor Brandon, Queen of France, in Cluny
 The symbolism and meaning of the tapestries by Yuki Fukazawa, 2020

Tapestries
1490s works
Unicorns
Gothic art
Lions in art
Monkeys in art